Maryus Erikovich Vaysberg (born 1 April 1971), also known as Marius Balčiūnas-Weisberg, is a Russian film director, producer, and screenwriter of Lithuanian and Jewish descent.

Career
His father, Erik Vaysberg, had had his own career in the Soviet film industry- he acted as the executive producer of Tarkovsky's film Mirror, on Andrei Konchalovsky's film Siberiade, and Karen Shakhnazarov's film The Assassin of the Tsar.

Vaysberg graduated from the VGIK in the mid-1990s and started releasing films. His first film, No Vacancy, starring Christina Ricci was released in 1999.  

Vaysberg's films are not well-loved by critics in his native Russia. However, many of his films are successful at the Russian box office, such as Naughty Grandma, Love in the Big City, 8 First Dates, and Not Ideal Man.

Filmography

References

External links

Living people
Russian film directors
1971 births
University of Southern California alumni
Russian people of Lithuanian descent
Russian people of Jewish descent